Emmelina lochmaius is a moth of the family Pterophoridae. It is known from Gabon.

References

Endemic fauna of Gabon
Oidaematophorini
Fauna of Gabon
Moths of Africa
Moths described in 1974